The reported presence of methane in the atmosphere of Mars is of interest to many geologists and astrobiologists, as methane may indicate the presence of microbial life on Mars, or a geochemical process such as volcanism or hydrothermal activity.

Since 2004, trace amounts of methane (range from 60 ppbv to under detection limit (< 0.05 ppbv)) have been reported in various missions and observational studies. The source of methane on Mars and the explanation for the enormous discrepancy in the observed methane concentrations are still unknown and are under study. Whenever methane is detected, it is rapidly removed  from the atmosphere by an efficient, yet unknown process.

History of detections 

Methane (CH4) is chemically unstable in the current oxidizing atmosphere of Mars. It would quickly break down due to ultraviolet (UV) radiation from the Sun and chemical reactions with other gases. Therefore, a persistent or episodic presence of methane in the atmosphere may imply the existence of a source to continually replenish the gas.

The first evidence of methane in the atmosphere was measured by ESA's Mars Express orbiter with an instrument called the Planetary Fourier Spectrometer. In March 2004, the Mars Express science team suggested the presence of methane in the atmosphere at a concentration of about 10 ppbv. This was confirmed soon after by three ground-based telescope teams, although large differences in the abundances were measured between observations taken in 2003 and 2006. This spatial and temporal variability of the gas suggests that the methane was locally concentrated and probably seasonal. It is estimated that Mars produces 270 tons of methane per year.

In 2011, NASA scientists reported a comprehensive search using high-resolution infrared spectroscopy from high-altitude Earth ground-based observatories (VLT, Keck-2, NASA-IRTF) for trace species (including methane) on Mars, deriving sensitive upper limits for methane (< 7 ppbv), ethane (< 0.2 ppbv), methanol (< 19 ppbv) and others (H2CO, C2H2, C2H4, N2O, NH3, HCN, CH3Cl, HCl, HO2 – all with limits at ppbv levels).

In August 2012, the Curiosity rover landed on Mars. The rover's instruments are capable of making precise abundance measurements, but cannot be used to distinguish between different isotopologues of methane and so it cannot determine if it is geophysical or biological in origin. However, the Trace Gas Orbiter (TGO) can measure these ratios and point to their origin.

The first measurements with Curiosity Tunable Laser Spectrometer (TLS) in 2012 indicated that there was no methane —or less than 5 ppb— at the landing site, later calculated to a baseline of 0.3 to 0.7 ppbv.  In 2013, NASA scientists again reported no detection of methane beyond a baseline. But in 2014, NASA reported that the Curiosity rover detected a tenfold increase ('spike') in methane in the atmosphere around it in late 2013 and early 2014. Four measurements taken over two months in this period averaged 7.2 ppbv, implying that Mars is episodically producing or releasing methane from an unknown source. Before and after, readings averaged around one-tenth that level. On 7 June 2018, NASA announced the confirmation of a cyclical seasonal variation in the background level of atmospheric methane. The largest concentration of methane detected in situ by the Curiosity rover showed a spike to 21 ppbv, during an event in late June 2019. The Mars Express orbiter happened to be performing spot tracking in that area 20 hours before Curiosity methane detection, as well as 24 and 48 hours after the detection, and the TGO was performing atmospheric observations at around the same time but at a higher latitude.

The Indian Mars Orbiter Mission, which entered orbit around Mars on 24 September 2014, is equipped with a Fabry–Pérot interferometer to measure atmospheric methane, but after entering Mars orbit it was determined that it was not capable of detecting methane, so the instrument was repurposed as an albedo mapper. As of April 2019, the TGO showed that the concentration of methane is under the detectable level (< 0.05 ppbv).

The Perseverance rover (landed Feb 2021) and the Rosalind Franklin rover (due 2023) will not be equipped to analyze the atmospheric methane nor its isotopes, so the proposed Mars sample-return mission in the mid-2030s seems the earliest a sample could be analyzed to differentiate a geological from a biological origin.

Potential sources

Geophysical 

The principal candidates for the origin of Mars' methane include non-biological processes such as water-rock reactions, radiolysis of water, and pyrite formation, all of which produce H2 that could then generate methane and other hydrocarbons via Fischer–Tropsch synthesis with CO and CO2. It has also been shown that methane could be produced by a process involving water, carbon dioxide, and the mineral olivine, which is known to be common on Mars. The required conditions for this reaction (i.e. high temperature and pressure) do not exist on the surface but may exist within the crust. Detection of the mineral by-product serpentinite would suggest that this process is occurring. An analog on Earth suggests that low-temperature production and exhalation of methane from serpentinized rocks may be possible on Mars. Another possible geophysical source could be ancient methane trapped in clathrate hydrates that may be released occasionally. Under the assumption of a cold early Mars environment, a cryosphere could trap such methane as clathrates in a stable form at depth, which might exhibit sporadic release.

On modern Earth, volcanism is a minor source of methane emission, and it is usually accompanied by sulfur dioxide gases. However, several studies of trace gases in the Martian atmosphere have found no evidence for sulfur dioxide in the Martian atmosphere, which makes volcanism on Mars unlikely to be the source of methane. Although geologic sources of methane such as serpentinization are possible, the lack of current volcanism, hydrothermal activity or hotspots is not favorable for geologic methane.

It had also been proposed that the methane might be replenished by meteorites entering the atmosphere of Mars, but researchers from the Imperial College London found that the volumes of methane released this way are too low to sustain the measured levels of the gas. It has been suggested that the methane was produced by chemical reactions in meteorites, driven by the intense heat during entry through the atmosphere. Although research published in December 2009 ruled out this possibility, research published in 2012 suggested that a source may be organic compounds on meteorites that are converted to methane by ultraviolet radiation. 

Lab tests have demonstrated that bursts of methane can be produced when an electrical discharge interacts with water ice and CO2. The discharges from the electrification of dust particles from sand storms and dust devils in contact with permafrost ice may produce about 1.41×1016 molecules of methane per joule of applied energy. 

Current photochemical models cannot explain the apparent rapid variability of the methane levels on Mars. Research suggests that the implied methane destruction lifetime is as long as ≈ 4 Earth years and as short as ≈ 0.6 Earth years. This unexplained fast destruction rate also suggests a very active replenishing source. A team from the Italian National Institute for Astrophysics suspects that the methane detected by the Curiosity rover may have been released from a nearby area called Medusae Fossae Formation located about 500 km east of Gale crater. The region is fractured and is likely volcanic in origin.

Biogenic 

Living microorganisms, such as methanogens, are another possible source, but no evidence for the presence of such organisms has been found on Mars. In Earth's oceans, biological methane production tends to be accompanied by ethane generation. The long-term ground-based spectroscopic observation did not find these organic molecules in the Martian atmosphere. Given the expected long lifetimes for some of these molecules, emission of biogenic organics seems to be extremely rare or currently non-existent. 

The reduction of carbon dioxide into methane by reaction with hydrogen can be expressed as follows:

CO2 + 4 H2 -> CH4 + 2 H2O (∆G˚' = -134 kJ/mol CH4)
This reaction of CO2 with the hydrogen to produce methane is coupled with the generation of an electrochemical gradient across the cell membrane, which is used to generate ATP through chemiosmosis. In contrast, plants and algae obtain their energy from sunlight or nutrients. 

Measuring the ratio of hydrogen and methane levels on Mars may help determine the likelihood of life on Mars. A low H2/CH4 ratio in the atmosphere (less than approximately 40) may indicate that a large part of atmospheric methane could be attributed to biological activities, but the observed ratios in the lower Martian atmosphere were "approximately 10 times" higher "suggesting that biological processes may not be responsible for the observed CH4".

Since the 2003 discovery of methane in the atmosphere, some scientists have been designing models and in vitro experiments testing the growth of methanogenic bacteria on simulated Martian soil, where all four methanogen strains tested produced substantial levels of methane, even in the presence of 1.0 wt% perchlorate salt. Methanogens do not require oxygen or organic nutrients, are non-photosynthetic, use hydrogen as their energy source, and carbon dioxide (CO2) as their carbon source, so they could exist in subsurface environments on Mars. If microscopic Martian life is producing the methane, it probably resides far below the surface, where it is still warm enough for liquid water to exist.

Research at the University of Arkansas published in 2015 suggested that some methanogens could survive on Mars' low pressure in an environment similar to a subsurface liquid aquifer on Mars. The four species tested were Methanothermobacter wolfeii, Methanosarcina barkeri, Methanobacterium formicicum, and Methanococcus maripaludis. 

A team led by Gilbert Levin suggested that both phenomena—methane production and degradation—could be accounted for by an ecology of methane-producing and methane-consuming microorganisms.

Even if rover missions determine that microscopic Martian life is the seasonal source of the methane, the life forms probably reside far below the surface, outside of the rover's reach.

Potential sinks

It was initially thought that methane is chemically unstable in an oxidizing atmosphere with UV radiation and so its lifetime in the Martian atmosphere should be about 400 years, but in 2014, it was concluded that the strong methane sinks are not subject to atmospheric oxidation, suggesting an efficient physical-chemical process at the surface that "consumes" methane, generically called a "sink". 
 
A hypothesis postulates that the methane is not consumed at all, but rather condenses and evaporates seasonally from clathrates. Another hypothesis is that methane reacts with tumbling surface sand quartz (silicon dioxide ) and olivine to form covalent Si –  bonds. The researchers showed that these solids can be oxidized and gases are ionized during the erosion processes. Thus, the ionized methane reacts with the mineral surfaces and bonds to them.

Images

See also

Atmosphere of Mars
Climate of Mars
Life on Mars
Weather of Mars

References

Atmosphere of Mars
Mars
Astrobiology